Silver Peak may refer to:

Mountains

United States
 
 
 Silver Peak (El Dorado County, California)
 Silver Peak (Fresno County, California)
 
 
 
Silver Peak (Catalina Island, California)
 
 Silver Peak Wilderness
 
 
 
 
 
 
 
 Silver Peak Range
 
 
 
 
 
 Silver Peak (King County, Washington)

Canada
   
 Silver Peak (Ontario)
 Silver Peak (Yukon)

New Zealand
 Silver peaks

Communities
 Silver Peak, Nevada

See also 
 Silverpeaks, New Zealand
 Silver Peak Systems
 Silver King Peak (disambiguation)